Nashville is an American musical drama television series. It was created by Academy Award winner Callie Khouri and produced by R. J. Cutler, Khouri, Steve Buchanan, Marshall Herskovitz, and Edward Zwick. The series stars Connie Britton as Rayna Jaymes, a legendary country music superstar whose stardom has begun to fade, and Hayden Panettiere as a rising younger star, Juliette Barnes. This is a list of cast members, as well as recurring and guest stars. A number of country musicians and celebrities also appear as themselves, including Brad Paisley, Katie Couric, Kelly Clarkson, Conan O'Brien, Luke Bryan, and Michelle Obama.

Cast

Regular

Notes:

Recurring

Characters

Main

Recurring
The following characters of Nashville may or may not be particularly significant to the story of the series; each was introduced in one season and would usually appear in subsequent seasons to a greater or lesser extent.

Judith Hoag as Tandy Hampton (season 1–3), Rayna's sister, the daughter and protégé of Lamar Wyatt, who plays referee to Rayna and Lamar. She leaves Nashville after accepting a job in San Francisco. 
Kimberly Williams-Paisley as Margaret "Peggy" Kenter (seasons 1 & 2; 20 episodes), Teddy's former co-worker at the credit union who helped him hide his embezzlement. They begin dating after Teddy and Rayna separate and marry after she lies to Teddy that she is pregnant. She is shot and killed while someone was attempting to kill Teddy.
David Alford as Bucky Dawes, Rayna's long-time seasoned and caring manager.
Ed Amatrudo as Glenn Goodman, Juliette Barnes's protective and reliable manager, often tasked with cleaning up the messes that Juliette leaves behind.  In the fourth season Juliette refers to him as "the man who has been like a father to me" and "my lucky charm."
Sylvia Jefferies as Jolene Barnes (season 1,3,5-6; 17 episodes), Juliette's overprotective & overbearing mother; a drug addict who later commits a murder-suicide.
Michiel Huisman as Liam McGuinnis (seasons 1 & 2; 13 episodes), Rayna's new music producer, who also has a brief fling with Rayna and Scarlett.
Chaley Rose as Zoey Dalton (seasons 2–4), Scarlett's childhood best friend who moves to Nashville, who starts dated Gunnar. She eventually gets a job as a backup singer for Juliette. She later breaks up with Gunnar and leaves Nashville to pursue a solo singing career in Los Angeles.
Laura Benanti as Sadie Stone (season 3), a country star who gets an offer to sign with Edgehill but later signs with Highway 65. She and Rayna become good friends. She leaves Nashville after shooting and killing her abusive ex-husband. 
Brette Taylor as Pam (season 3), as Luke's new backup singer, and has a brief fling with Deacon.
Alexa Vega as Kiley (season 3), Gunnar's first love who is now a struggling single mother. She lied to Gunnar saying that her 9-year-old son was Gunnar's but his brother Jason actually is.
Derek Hough as Noah West (season 3–4), an actor who lands a role about a famous country singer.
Christina Aguilera as Jade St. John (season 3), a pop singer who is trying to make it in country music.
Jay Hernandez as Dante Rivas (season 1; 6 episodes), Jolene's sober companion and Juliette's lover, who, after attempting to blackmail Juliette, is killed by Jolene in a murder-suicide.
Charlie Bewley as Charles  "Charlie" Wentworth (season 2), a married confident business man, who owns a radio stations across the country, and had an affair with Juliette.
Christina Chang as Megan Vannoy (season 2), Deacon's lawyer at the beginning of season two; Deacon and Megan were in a romantic relationship in season two until Deacon found out that she cheated on him with Teddy. 

Todd Truley as Marshall Evans (season 1; 11 episodes), former president and CEO of Edgehill Republic Records. In the beginning of season two he gets fired by the board of Edgehill Records and is replaced by Jeff Fordham.
J. D. Souther as Watty White (season 1; 6 episodes), legendary country music producer, radio personality, and songwriter who counsels Rayna Jaymes.
Kourtney Hansen as Emily (seasons 1–6; 60 episodes), Juliette's assistant and friend.
Tilky Montgomery Jones as Sean Butler (season 1; 5 episodes), professional football quarterback and Juliette's ex-husband.
Rya Kihlstedt as Marilyn Rhodes (season 1; 8 episodes), Avery's former manager and lover.
Wyclef Jean as Dominic King (season 1; 5 episodes), the head of Avery's former label.
Chloe Bennet as Hailey (season 1; 7 episodes), briefly dated Gunnar.
Susan Misner as Stacy (season 1; 5 episodes), a veterinarian and Deacon's ex-girlfriend.
Burgess Jenkins as Randy Roberts (season 1; 3 episodes), a long-time friend and music producer for Rayna Jaymes.
Afton Williamson as Makena (season 1; 3 episodes), Juliette's press agent who manages her career and fosters her reputation.
David Clayton Rogers as Jason Scott (season 1; 3 episodes), Gunnar's brother, who got convicted to an 8-year sentence after armed robbery. He is beaten to death after Gunnar throws the gun he has acquired, illegally, in a river. He taught Gunnar to play the guitar.
Derrick Worsley as School Principal (season 3; episode 4), Radio Station Employee (season 2; episode 20), Background Singer (season 2; episode 14), and Police Chief (season 2; episode 11)
J. Karen Thomas as Audrey Carlisle, Coleman's wife (season 1; 4 episodes).
Derek Krantz as Brent McKinney (seasons 1 & 2; 12 episodes), Brent is an openly gay former marketing and public relations employee for Edgehill. He once dated Will.
Chaley Rose as Zoey Dalton, (seasons 2–4; 28 episodes), Scarlett's childhood friend who moves to Nashville to pursue a music career. She ends up dating Gunnar and forms the band ZAG with Gunnar and Avery, but breaks up with Gunnar and moves from Nashville.
Nick Jandi as Dr. Caleb Rand (seasons 3–4; 19 episodes), a doctor who Scarlett and Deacon meet when Deacon comes down with liver cancer. Scareltt initially grows close to him as she is worried about Deacon, but the two form a romantic relationship. She breaks up with him in season four when she realizes she has feelings for Gunnar lingering. 
Moniqua Plante as Natasha, (season 3; 10 episodes), a prostitute who Jeff uses to grow close to Teddy (without telling Teddy who she really is) and uses to blackmail Teddy. She eventually begins working with the police through a wire to incriminate Teddy to take down Tandy. 
Gunnar Sizemore as Micah Brenner, (season 3; 12 episodes), Kiley and Jason's son, Gunnar's nephew for who Kiley lies to Gunnar and tells is his son which leads to a custody battle. 
Keean Johnson as Colt Wheeler, (seasons 2–4; 25 episodes), Luke's son who dates Maddie. 
Alexa PenaVega as Kiley Brenner, (season 3; 9 episodes), Gunnar's first love who has a son with Jason.
Brette Taylor as Pam York, (season 3; 5 episodes), a backup singer on Will's tour who has a fling with Deacon and helps him through the grief that he is going through when Rayna rejects his proposal.
Mykelti Williamson as Terry George, (season 3; 9 episodes), a homeless man who Scarlett befriends and helps get back on her feet when she asks him to help her write music.
Christina Aguilera as Jade St. John, (season 3; 3 episodes), a pop singer who wants to make a country album.
Scott Reeves as Noel Laughlin, (seasons 3–4; 20 episodes), Scarlett and Gunnar's manager who is never written for due to lack of knowledge of in seasons five and six.
Rex Linn as Bill Lexington, (seasons 3–4; 3 episodes), Will's homophobic dad who believes Will killed his mother.
Kyle Dean Massey as Kevin Bicks (seasons 3–5; 14 episodes), An openly gay country music singer-songwriter who collaborates with Will on his music. He later becomes Will's boyfriend.
Riley Smith as Markus Keen, (season 4; 6 episodes), a hotshot member of a newly broken up band who Rayna spends millions to sign and is a trouble to work with. He leaves when he finishes his record and his band gets back together.
Cynthia McWilliams as Gabriella Manning, (season 4; 5 episodes), Luke's assistant who helps him learn the workings of a record label. She and Will have a fling but she leaves when he refuses to accept Will in the public eye.
Michael Lowry as Kenneth Devine, (season 4; 5 episodes), Luke's assistant for his new label.
Scout Taylor-Compton as Erin, (season 4; 6 episodes), a roadie for Juliette's tour who has a fling with Gunnar.
Katie Callaway as Christel, (season 4; 5 episodes), Luke's Intern for his new label.
Mark Collie as Frankie (season 4; 14 episodes), a failing bar owner who Deacon buys out to start The Beverly who ends up hurting the family.
Jessy Schram as Cash Gray, (season 4; 12 episodes), Frankie's daughter who poison's Maddie's opinion of her family and helps her get emancipated and launch a solo career.
Rhiannon Giddens as Hallie Jordan (seasons 5–6; 20 episodes), a church woman who saves Juliette after her plane crash and eventually Juliette gets signed to Highway 65.
Joseph David-Jones as Clay (season 5; 14 episodes), Maddie's bipolar rough boyfriend.
Christian Coulson as Damien George (season 5; 9 episodes), a hotshot music video director who works with The Exes. Scarlett has feelings for him and he eventually ends up being the father of her deceased baby. 
Kaitlin Doubleday as Jessie Caine (season 5-6), a musician who returns to town to focus on her career and take back the son who was taken from her. She and Deacon date.
Jeff Nordling as Brad Maitland (season 5-6), a charming-narcissistic owner of the most successful record label in Nashville. He and Jessie have a son together.
Katrina Norman as Polly (season 5; 3 episodes), a stunning-road manager who wants Avery to leave Juliette.
Linds Edwards as Carl Hockeny (season 5; 6 episodes), Rayna's stalker who indirectly causes her death.
Ben Taylor as Flynn Burnett (seasons 5–6; 9 episodes), a love interest for Daphne.
Odessa Adlon as Liv (season 5; 6 episodes), a homeless girl Daphne befriends.
Jordan Woods-Robinson as Randall St. Claire (season 5), Rayna's intern who is obsessed with her.
Murray Bartlett as Jakob Fine (season 5-6), a fashion designer who wants Will to leave Kevin.
Josh Stamberg as Darius (season 6), the president of a cult in Nashville who propositions Juliette and brainwashes her to work for him and leave her family while quitting music.
Jake Etheridge as Sean (season 6), a recent military veteran suffering from severe PTSD who has yet to embrace his talent and passion for music. Scarlett meets him at the horse farm and grows close to him.
Rainee Lyleson as Alannah (season 6), a newcomer to the Nashville music scene, and a beautiful singer-songwriter who starts out as a backup singer but will soon be discovered for the star that she actually is meant to be when she joins Avery, Will, and Gunnar's band. Gunnar and Alannah have a fling.
Nic Luken as Jonah Ford (season 6), a famous male pop star who is very handsome, extremely confident, and charming. He and Maddie date.
Dylan Arnold as Twig (season 6), a childhood friend to Jonah who has feelings for Maddie.
Ilse DeLange as Ilse de Witt (season 6), a female coach on a talent show Daphne joins.
Mia Maestro as Rosa (season 6), a dedicated follower of Darius’ cult who now is having doubts about her role in it.
Ronny Cox as Gideon (season 6), a crusty, frustrated, would-be musician and recently reformed lifelong alcoholic who resented his son Deacon's success.

Notable guest stars

Cameos

Katie Couric as herself
Kate York as herself
Vince Gill as himself 
Pam Tillis as herself
Little Jimmy Dickens as himself
Kip Moore as himself
Dan Auerbach as himself
The Band Perry as Themselves 
Brad Paisley as himself
Conan O'Brien as himself
Kelly Clarkson as herself
Zac Brown as himself
Jay DeMarcus as himself
Carrie Underwood as herself
Michelle Obama as herself
Kellie Pickler as herself
Austin Dillon as himself
Mario Lopez as himself
Barbara Walters as herself
Whoopi Goldberg as herself
Sherri Shepherd as herself
Jenny McCarthy as herself
Robin Roberts as herself
Maria Menounos as herself
Luke Bryan as himself
Joe Nichols as himself
Sara Evans as herself
Florida Georgia Line as Themselves
Steven Tyler as himself
Thomas Rhett as himself
Kesha as herself
Kelsea Ballerini as herself
Elton John as himself
Megan Barry as herself
Carolina Chocolate Drops as Nashville Chocolate Drops
Kathie Lee Gifford as herself
Hoda Kotb as herself 
Carla Gugino as Virginia Wyatt
Ruby Amanfu as herself
Blair Gardner as himself
Trevor Noah as himself
Harry Connick Jr. as himself
Michael Ray as himself
Jaden Smith as himself
Cassadee Pope as herself
RaeLynn as herself
Lauren Alaina as herself
Kacey Musgraves as herself
Danielle Bradbery as herself
Maddie & Tae as themselves
Brantley Gilbert as himself 
 Steve Earle as himself

Actors

Ming-Na Wen as Calista Reeve (1 episode)
Nicholas Pryor as Sam Boone (1 episode)
Dana Wheeler-Nicholson as Beverly O'Connor (7 episodes)
Charlotte Ross as Ruth Bennett (1 episode)
Bridgit Mendler as Ashley Wilkenson (1 episode)

References

External links

Cast
Nashville